Wellendingen is a town in the district of Rottweil, in Baden-Württemberg, Germany.

References

Rottweil (district)